Pacific Coast Highway (stylized as Pacific Coast Hwy) is a video game written by Ron Rosen for the Atari 8-bit family and published by Datasoft in 1982. It is a clone of Frogger, with the key gameplay differences being that Pacific Coast Highway allows two-player simultaneous play, and the road and water segments are split into separate, alternating, screens.

Ron Rosen later wrote the 1983 platform game Mr. Robot and His Robot Factory

Gameplay

Each player starts at the bottom of the screen and the goal is to reach the top. Player one is a rabbit and player two, if present, is a tortoise. The difference between the two is entirely visual, and the tortoise and hare theme is not present elsewhere.

The first screen is the highway from the title, with eight lanes of traffic to avoid, divided in the center by a median strip (called a "rolling sidewalk" in the manual). The second screen is water-themed, and players must hop on the boats and rafts to reach the top. The median strip equivalent for the water is a row of connected life preservers. In later levels the median strip and life preservers move, first in one direction only, then randomly switching. Getting hit by a vehicle results in an ambulance taking the character away (or a rescue boat for the water sequence).

The manual describes the second screen as crossing a beach of hot sand by jumping on towels and surfboards, but this isn't present in the game itself.

Reception
COMPUTE! editorial assistant Charles Brannon wrote, "A frustrating aspect of the game is that if one player gets hit (or takes a plunge), both players have to start over."

In a C+ review for The Book of Atari Software 1983 the reviewer wrote, "The graphics and sound are fair in this game; but although it offers something of a challenge to the uninitiated, it cannot lay claim to originality."

See also
Preppie!
Frogger II: ThreeeDeep!

References

External links
Pacific Coast Highway at Atari Mania

1982 video games
Atari 8-bit family games
Atari 8-bit family-only games
Datasoft games
Multiplayer and single-player video games
Top-down video games
Video game clones
Video games developed in the United States